The discography of Ziggy Marley and the Melody Makers, a Jamaican reggae family group, consists of ten studio albums, one live album, four compilation albums, twenty-three singles and four video albums.

The four siblings initially came together as a musical unit in 1979 to record "Children Playing in the Streets". Bob Marley had composed the song four years earlier for his children and wanted to share this gift with children around the world. All royalties from the single were pledged to the United Nations, to aid its efforts during the International Year of the Child. Ziggy and Stephen performed together at their father's funeral on May 21, 1981, dancing alongside the I-Threes and the Wailers, during their brief homage to the great artist. Later that year, The Melody Makers released their second single, "What a Plot," which, like their debut, appeared on their late father's own Tuff Gong label. In 1984, The Melody Makers began a recording session with English producer Steve Levine that released a single, "Lying in Bed". In 1985, the group released their first album, Play the Game Right. In 1986, Hey World was released and credited to Ziggy Marley & the Melody Makers.

In 1988, the group signed to Virgin Records and released their fourth album Conscious Party. In the same year, the group released a concert DVD called "Conscious Party: Live at the Palladium". A year later, their fifth album One Bright Day was released. In 1991, the group released their sixth album Jahmekya. In 1993, the group released their final album on Virgin called, Joy and Blues.

In 1995, the group signed a record deal with Elektra and released Free Like We Want 2 B accompanied by the group's own recording label "Ghetto Youths United". In early 1997, the group released second best-of album The Best of (1988–1993). Later that year, the group released ninth album Fallen Is Babylon. In 1999, the group released their tenth and final studio album, The Spirit of Music, which peaked at #1 on the Top Reggae Albums chart. In 2000, the group released their live album Ziggy Marley & the Melody Makers Live, Vol. 1, and the concert DVD "Ziggy Marley & the Melody Makers Live" followed in May 2001.

In addition to Ziggy Marley and the Melody Maker's work, they have covered several songs from their father Bob Marley, including "Natty Dread", "Positive Vibration", "Stir It Up", "Get Up, Stand Up", "Sun Is Shining", "Africa Unite", "Could You Be Loved", and several other songs.

Albums

Studio

Live

Compilation

Selected singles

Bob Marley cover songs
"African Herbsman"
"Africa Unite"
"Could You Be Loved"
"I Shot the Sheriff
"Get Up, Stand Up"
"Jamming"
"Natty Dread"
"One Love/People Get Ready
"Positive Vibration"
"Rainbow Country"
"Rat Race"
"Small Axe"
"Stir It Up"
"Sun Is Shining"
"Time Will Tell"

Concert DVDs
 1988: Conscious Party: Live at the Palladium
 1996: Marley Magic: Tribute to Bob Marley
 1999: One Love: The Bob Marley All-Star Tribute 
 2001: Ziggy Marley and the Melody Makers Live
 2008: Africa Unite: A Celebration of Bob Marley's 60th Birthday

References

Reggae discographies
Discographies of Jamaican artists